Eucalyptus leprophloia, commonly known as scaly butt mallee, is a species of mallee that is endemic to a small area in Western Australia. It has rough, fibrous bark on the base of the trunk, smooth bark above, lance-shaped adult leaves, flower buds in groups of seven to eleven, white flowers and cup-shaped to barrel-shaped fruit.

Description
It has rough, fibrous, greyish brown bark on the base of the trunks, smooth greyish over pale copper-coloured bark above. Flowering occurs from August to October and the flowers are white.

Taxonomy and naming
Eucalyptus leprophloia was first formally described in 1993 by Ian Brooker and Stephen Hopper from a specimen Hopper collected near Badgingarra in 1986. The description was published in the journal Nuytsia. According to Brooker and Hopper the specific epithet (leprophloia) is derived from Greek and means "scaly bark".

Distribution and habitat
Scaly butt mallee is only known from near Badgingarra to the Mount Adams area where it grows in a range of habitats including hill slopes and gentle valleys with powderbark wandoo and coastal blackbutt.

Conservation status
This mallee is listed as "endangered" under the Australian Government Environment Protection and Biodiversity Conservation Act 1999 and an interim recovery plant has been prepared. It is also classified as "Threatened Flora (Declared Rare Flora — Extant)" by the Department of Environment and Conservation (Western Australia). Several populations of the species occur on private property and the main threats to the species relate to farming activities including ploughing, use of fertiliser and herbicide, grazing by livestock and rabbits. Land clearing and inappropriate fire regimes are also a threat.

See also

List of Eucalyptus species

References

Eucalypts of Western Australia
leprophloia
Myrtales of Australia
Mallees (habit)
Plants described in 1993
Taxa named by Stephen Hopper
Taxa named by Ian Brooker